Aosta (formerly ;  , Veulla  or Ouhta ; ;) is the principal city of the Aosta Valley, a bilingual region in the Italian Alps,  north-northwest of Turin. It is situated near the Italian entrance of the Mont Blanc Tunnel, at the confluence of the Buthier and the Dora Baltea, and at the junction of the Great and Little St Bernard Pass routes.

History

Aosta was settled in proto-historic times and later became a centre of the Salassi, many of whom were killed or sold into slavery by the Romans in 25 BC. The campaign was led by Terentius Varro, who then founded the Roman colony of Augusta Praetoria Salassorum, housing 3,000 retired veterans. After 11 BC Aosta became the capital of the Alpes Graies ("Grey Alps") province of the Empire. Its position at the confluence of two rivers, at the end of the Great and the Little St Bernard Pass, gave it considerable military importance, and its layout was that of a Roman military camp.

After the fall of the Western Empire, the city was conquered, in turn, by the Burgundians, the Ostrogoths, and the Byzantines. The Lombards, who had annexed it to their Italian kingdom, were expelled by the Frankish Empire under Pepin the Short. Under his son, Charlemagne, Aosta acquired importance as a post on the Via Francigena, leading from Aachen to Italy. After 888 AD it was part of the renewed Kingdom of Italy under Arduin of Ivrea and Berengar of Friuli.

In the 10th century Aosta became part of the Kingdom of Burgundy. After the fall of the latter in 1032, it became part of the lands of Count Humbert I of Savoy.

The privilege of holding the assembly of the states-general was granted to the inhabitants in 1189. An executive council was nominated from this body in 1536, and continued to exist until 1802. After the Congress of Vienna restored the rule of Savoy it was reconstituted and formally recognized by Charles Albert of Sardinia, at the birth of his grandson Prince Amedeo, who was created duke of Aosta.

Climate
Aosta is in the rain shadow of the Mont Blanc massif and features a humid subtropical climate (Köppen: Cfa), bordering on a cool semi-arid climate (Köppen: BSk), also bordering on an oceanic climate (Köppen: Cfb) and under the Köppen climate classification due to its low average annual rainfall. It is considered temperate oceanic (Trewartha: Do) in the Trewartha climate classification. 

The city experiences cool to very cold winters, hot summers and relatively dry conditions throughout the year.

Main sights

Prehistoric
Saint-Martin-de-Corléans Megalithic Area with artifacts and tombs dating to the Neolithic era.

Ancient remains

The ancient town walls of Augusta Prætoria Salassorum are still preserved almost in their entirety, enclosing a rectangle .

Towers stand at angles to the enceinte and others are positioned at intervals, with two at each of the four gates, making twenty towers in total. They are roughly  square, and project  from the wall. Of the 20 original towers, the following are well preserved:
Tour du lépreux (French for Leper's Tower), was given this name after a leper called Pierre-Bernard Guasco was jailed there in the late 17th century. Le lépreux de la cité d'Aoste, a novel by Xavier de Maistre, is also named after this leper.
Tourneuve (13th century).
Tour du Pailleron.
Tower (Castle) of Bramafan, built in the 11th century over a Roman bastion. It was the residence of the Savoy viscounts. In Franco-Provençal, Bramé la fan means "To scream for hunger".
Tour du Baillage.
Tour Fromage.

The east and south gates exist intact. The latter, a double gate with three arches flanked by two towers known as the Porta Praetoria (1st century AD) was the eastern gate to the city, and has preserved its original forms apart from the marble covering. It is formed by two series of arches enclosing a small square.

The rectangular arrangement of the streets is modeled on a Roman plan dividing the town into 64 blocks (insulae). This arrangement makes it clear that guarding the road was the main raison d'être of the city.

In the nearby was the amphitheatre, built under Claudius. A marketplace surrounded by storehouses on three sides with a temple in the centre with two on the open (south) side, as well as a thermae, have also been discovered.

Outside the town walls is the Arch of Augustus, a triumphal arch in honour of Augustus, built in 35 BC to celebrate the victory of consul Varro Murena over the Salassi. About  to the west is a single-arched Roman bridge, called the Pont d'Aël. It has a closed passage, lighted by windows for foot passengers in winter, and above it an open footpath.

There are considerable remains of the ancient road from Eporedia (modern Ivrea) to Augusta Praetoria into the Aosta Valley.

Other sights
The Cathedral, built in the 4th century and replaced in the 11th century by a new edifice dedicated to the Madonna. It is annexed to the Roman Forum.
The Romanesque-Gothic Collegiate church of Saint Ursus (Saint-Ours). Its most evocative feature is the cloister, which can be entered through a hall on the left of the façade. It is dedicated to Ursus of Aosta.
The Saint-Bénin College, built about 1000 by the Benedictines. It is now an exhibition site.
The Bridge of Grand Arvou, a medieval arch bridge-aqueduct.

Transport
Aosta lies on the crossroad of two major trans-alpine trunk roads: national road 26 (Italian: SS26, French: RN26) connecting the city of Chivasso to Little St Bernard Pass on the Italy-France border, and national road 27 (Italian: SS27, French: RN27) connecting the city of Aosta to the Great St Bernard Pass on the Italy-Switzerland border. Aosta is also served by the A5 motorway between Turin and Courmayeur.

Aosta railway station, opened in 1886, forms part of the Chivasso–Ivrea–Aosta railway. Direct trains only connect Aosta up to the city of Ivrea. The branch line to nearby Pré-Saint-Didier, in the Valdigne, on the way towards Courmayeur was closed in 2015. Train service is operated by Trenitalia.

The main bus hub is located near the Aosta train station. Buses connect the city of Aosta to the nearby valleys and to destinations outside the region, including Turin, Milan, Chamonix (France) and Martigny (Switzerland).

Aosta airport is located 5 km to the east of the city.

Notable people 
 
 
 List of mayors of Aosta
 Anselm of Canterbury (1033–1109), archbishop of Canterbury from 1093 to 1109.
 Xavier de Maistre (1763–1852), writer of Le lépreux de la cité d'Aoste ("The leper from Aosta", 1811)
 Xavier Usel (born 2000), footballer

See also

Duke of Aosta
Franco-Provençal language - Valdôtain dialect.
Aostan French
:Category:Towers in Italy
:Category:Tribes involved in the Gallic Wars

Twin towns - sister cities

Aosta is twinned with:

 Chamonix-Mont-Blanc, France
 Kaolack, Senegal
 Martigny, Switzerland
 Narbonne, France
 Sinaia, Romania

Notes

References
Inline citations

General references

Further reading
 Lin Colliard, La vieille Aoste, éd. Musumeci, Aoste, 1972.
 Aimé Chenal, Promenade archéologique de la ville d'Aoste, ITLA, Aoste, 1965.
 Mauro Caniggia Nicolotti & Luca Poggianti, Aoste inconnue : traces cachées, oubliées ou invisibles de la vieille ville, typog. La Vallée, Aoste, 2010.
 Carlo Promis, Le antichità di Aosta, (Turin, 1862);
 Édouard Bérard, Atti della Società di Archeologia di Torino, iii. 119 seq.; Notizie degli Scavi, passim.

External links

 
 Photos of Aosta 
 Virtual Museum Vallée (VMV), virtual museum of Aosta city
 Augusta Praetoria Site plan & photos from the Aosta Valley Regional Authority.
 Ancient Places TV: HD Video of Aosta, Italy

 
Cities and towns in Aosta Valley
Roman amphitheatres in Italy